The 1948 Connecticut Huskies football team represented the University of Connecticut in the 1948 college football season.  The Huskies were led by 14th-year head coach J. Orlean Christian and completed the season with a record of 3–5.

Schedule

References

Connecticut
UConn Huskies football seasons
Connecticut Huskies football